K. P. Nirmal Kumar (കെ.പി. നിർമൽ കുമാർ; born 1947) is a Malayalam-language writer from Kerala, India. He is reckoned among the few front-ranking fiction writers in Malayalam who have contemporary vision.

He entered the literary field with the publication of the story Irumbinte Sangeetham in Mathrubhumi Weekly. His first collection Jalam won the Kerala Sahitya Akademi Award in the year 1971. His next works Oru Sangham Abhayarthikal and Krishna Gandhaka Jwalakal were published by Current Books. He also translated Kamala Das's Summer In Calcutta into Malayalam. His next work Chelakkarayude Atheetha Swapnangal was published only in 1995 by Mulberry Publications, after a gap of nearly two decades. His novel Janamejayante Jignasa (Janamejaya's Curiosity) was published in 2010 and looks at some of the episodes in the Mahabharata and at the emotional underpinning of the characters. His latest work, Innathe Athithi Atheethasakthi,  follows an unconventional method to depict Mahabharatha and focuses on themes of sex, power and invasions in the epic. A graduate in commerce, Nirmal Kumar worked in the Kanjirappally branch of the Bank of Baroda and retired as the Senior Manager. He lives in Peringode, Palakkad district.

Works
 Jalam (Current Books, 1970) (Stories)
 Oru Sangham Abhayarthikal (Current Books) (Stories)
 Krishna Gandhaka Jwalakal (Current Books) (Stories)
 Chelakkarayude Atheetha Swapnangal (Mulberry Publications, 1995) (Stories)
 Mananchirayile Pottichirikkunna Pathradhipar (DC Books, 2005) (Stories)
 Janamejayante Jignasa (DC Books, 2010) (Novel)
 Innathe Athithi Atheethasakthi (DC Books, 2013) (Novel)

Awards
 1971: Kerala Sahitya Akademi Award for Jalam
 2005: Padmarajan Award for Jaran / Avanoru Poojyapaadan

References 

1947 births
Living people
Malayali people
Indian male short story writers
Indian male novelists
Writers from Kottayam
Malayalam-language writers
Malayalam short story writers
Malayalam novelists
Recipients of the Kerala Sahitya Akademi Award
20th-century Indian short story writers
20th-century Indian novelists
Novelists from Kerala
20th-century Indian male writers